King's Valley II: The Seal of El Giza is a game for MSX1 and MSX2 computers by Konami. It is a sequel to King's Valley from 1985.

The MSX2 version only saw a release in Japan. The same goes for a very rare "contest" version. The contest was about making levels with the games' built-in level editor, held by four Japanese MSX magazines, two of them are MSX.FAN and Beep. The winners of this contest received a gold cartridge with the twenty custom stages on it. Custom levels can be saved to either a disk or tape, and the levels are interchangeable between both the MSX1 and MSX2 versions.

Story 
Far, far into the future, inter-planetary archaeologist Vick XIII, makes a choking discovery.
The pyramids on earth are malfunctioning devices of alien origin with enough energy to destroy earth.
And it's up to Vick to switch off the core functions of El Giza.

Gameplay 
The game consists of six pyramids each with its own wall engravings and color pattern; every pyramid contains 10 levels.
The idea of the game is to collect crystals called soul stones in each level by solving the different puzzles and evading or killing the enemies using the many tools and weapons available to unlock the exit door that will take you to the next level.

Versions 
The later Konami game Castlevania: Portrait of Ruin for the Nintendo DS reuses the stage musics "In Search of the Secret Spell" and "Sandfall" for the Egyptian area of the game.

The MSX 2 version was the same game except minor changes like the music was remixed and some of the items and backgrounds recolored.

Castlevania: Harmony of Despair uses a remix of the Stage Clear theme as the Stage Clear theme for Chapter 7: Beauty, Desire, Situation Dire (not found on the OST).

References

1988 video games
Ancient Egypt in fiction
Konami games
MSX games
MSX2 games
Puzzle video games
Video games scored by Kinuyo Yamashita
Video games scored by Michiru Yamane
Video games set in Egypt
Video games developed in Japan